Kantamani (pronounced ) is a ragam in Carnatic music (musical scale of South Indian classical music). It is the 61st Melakarta rāgam in the 72 melakarta rāgam system of Carnatic music. It is called Kuntalam in Muthuswami Dikshitar school of Carnatic music.

Structure and Lakshana

It is the 1st rāgam in the 11th chakra Rudra. The mnemonic name is Rudra-Pa. The mnemonic phrase is sa ri gu mi pa dha na. Its  structure (ascending and descending scale) is as follows (see swaras in Carnatic music for details on below notation and terms):
: 
: 
(the notes used in this scale are chathusruthi rishabham, antara gandharam, prati madhyamam, shuddha dhaivatham, shuddha nishadham)

As it is a melakarta rāgam, by definition it is a sampoorna rāgam (has all seven notes in ascending and descending scale). It is the prati madhyamam equivalent of Mararanjani, which is the 25th melakarta.

Janya Rāgams
Kantamani has a couple of minor janya rāgams (derived scales) associated with it. See List of janya rāgams for full list of janya rāgams associated with Kantamani and other 71 melakarta rāgams.

Compositions
A few compositions set to this rāgam are:

Sri Sugandhi Kuntalambike by Muttuswami Dikshitar
Nadasukam by Koteeswara Iyer
Bhuvaneshwari pahi by Dr. M. Balamuralikrishna
Palintuvo by Thyagaraja

Related rāgams
This section covers the theoretical and scientific aspect of this rāgam.

Kantamani's notes when shifted using Graha bhedam, yields Manavati melakarta rāgam. Graha bhedam is the step taken in keeping the relative note frequencies same, while shifting the shadjam to the next note in the rāgam. For further details and an illustration refer Graha bhedam on Manavati.

Notes

References

Melakarta ragas